Astraea  is a plant genus of the family Euphorbiaceae first described as a genus in 1841. It is native to tropical regions of the Western Hemisphere.

Species

References

Crotoneae
Euphorbiaceae genera